Ludwig Dringenberg (born between  1410 and 1415

at  Dringenberg in the Prince-Bishopric of Paderborn; died in 1477 at Sélestat in Alsace), was a German monk, educator and humanist.

Born in Dringenberg in  Westphalia, Ludwig  probably attended the school of the Brethren of the Common Life, known as the Hieronymusschule in the monastery at Böddeken. He began his studies at Heidelberg in 1430 and in 1441, he was appointed director of the Latin school at Sélestat. At Sélestat he founded the famous Humanist Library in 1442. He had the humanist Jakob Wimpfeling as a pupil.

References

Sources

1410s births
1477 deaths
German Renaissance humanists
Year of birth uncertain